The Embassy of South Korea in Ankara is the diplomatic mission of South Korea in Turkey. The current ambassador is Lee Won-Ik.

References 

South Korea
Ankara
South Korea–Turkey relations